The 1992 Australian Sports Sedan Championship was a CAMS sanctioned motor racing title for Sports Sedans. The championship, which was the 8th Australian Sports Sedan Championship, was won by Tasmanian Kerry Baily driving a Toyota Celica Supra.

Calendar
The championship was contested over a twelve round series with one race per round.

Championship results

References

National Sports Sedan Series
Sports Sedan Championship